Tiffany Lamb (born 22 September 1966) is an Australian model, actress, and TV presenter. She is best known for co-hosting Perfect Match, and starring in Flipper - The New Adventures and Paradise Beach. She has three daughters; Matisse (age 16), Carter (age 14) and Ollie (age 12)

Filmography

FILM

TELEVISION

External links

References

Australian television presenters
Australian women television presenters
Living people
1966 births